Yoshikawa is a city in Saitama Prefecture, Japan

Yoshikawa may also refer to:

Places
Yoshikawa, Kōchi, a former village in Kami District, Kōchi Prefecture, Japan
Yoshikawa, Niigata, a former town in Nakakubiki District, Niigata Prefecture, Japan

Other uses
Yoshikawa (surname), a Japanese surname
Yoshikawa Station (disambiguation), multiple railway stations in Japan
5237 Yoshikawa, a main-belt asteroid